The surname Dold may refer to 

Albrecht Dold (1928–2011), German mathematician
Bob Dold (born 1969), former U.S. Representative
Brian Dold (1930–1976), South African cricketer
Chris Dold (born 1987), Canadian sailor
Douglas Dold (1895–1980), South African cricketer
Erwin Dold (1919–2012), German concentration camp commandant in World War II
Hermann Dold (1882–1962), German physician and bacteriologist
John Dold (1902–1968), South African rugby union international and first-class cricketer
R. Bruce Dold, American journalist
Thomas Dold (born 1984), German athlete
Yvonne Dold-Samplonius (1937–2014), Dutch mathematician and historian

See also 
Samuel Dold Morgan, American businessman, builder, and manufacturer